Asociação Sport Dili e Benfica, commonly known as Benfica Dili is an East Timorese football club based in Dili. The team plays in the Liga Futebol Amadora.

Honours
Taça A.C.A.I.T. champions: 1968
Taça de Timor champions: 1968
Tormeo de Abertura champions: 1968

Competition records

Liga Futebol Amadora
2016 Segunda Divisao: 5th in Group A

Taça 12 de Novembro
2016: 2nd Round

Former coaches
Joao Godinho

Sponsors
Timor Telecom

References

External links
Official site
facebook page

Football clubs in East Timor
Football
Association football clubs established in 1938